The 2016 Tunisian Athletics Championships was the year's national championship in outdoor track and field for Tunisia. It was held from 15 to 17 July at the Stade Olympique de Radès in Radès.

Several events were contested separately from the main championships: the combined track and field events were held on 16–17 April, the 10,000 metres on 21 May, and the road walking events in Korba, Tunisia on 20 March.

Nada Cheroudi broke the Tunisian national record in the women's heptathlon with a score of  	5658 points. Mouna Jaidi dominated the women's throws, taking three of the four titles on offer. At the team level, the National Guard Sports Club won with 13 titles, followed by the Kairouan Municipal Athletics Club on 12 titles.

Champions

References

Championnats nationaux des épreuves combinées , Stade d'athlétisme de Radès, 16 et 17 avril 2016 archive
Championnats nationaux de marche sur route, organisé à Korba, 20 mars 2016 archive
Championnats nationaux du 10 000 m, Stade d'athlétisme de Radès, 21 mai 2016 archive
Championnats nationaux absolus individuels, Stade d'athlétisme de Radès, du 15 au 17 juillet 2016 archive

Tunisian Athletics Championships
Tunisian Athletics Championships
Tunisian Athletics Championships
Tunisian Athletics Championships
Sports competitions in Radès
21st century in Radès